Chlorodynerus is an old world genus of potter wasps. The following species are included in this genus:

 Chlorodynerus araxanus (Blüthgen, 1956)
 Chlorodynerus arenicola (Kostylev, 1935)
 Chlorodynerus biskrensis (Blüthgen, 1954) 
 Chlorodynerus castrorum (Blüthgen, 1954)  
 Chlorodynerus chloroticus (Spinola, 1838)
 Chlorodynerus deesanus (Cameron, 1907) 
 Chlorodynerus diglaensis (Blüthgen, 1954) 
 Chlorodynerus flavoferrugineus Giordani Soika, 1970  
 Chlorodynerus geometricus (Giordani Soika, 1940)
 Chlorodynerus guichardi Giordani Soika, 1974
 Chlorodynerus gratus (Kostylev, 1940) 
 Chlorodynerus horni (Giordani Soika, 1935) 
 Chlorodynerus incisipes (Kostylev, 1935) 
 Chlorodynerus infrenis Giordani Soika, 1970 
 Chlorodynerus intricatus Giordani Soika, 1957
 Chlorodynerus kelidopterus (Kohl, 1906)
 Chlorodynerus lamaosensis (Schulthess, 1934) 
 Chlorodynerus lamellipes (Giordani Soika, 1940)
 Chlorodynerus loeffleri Giordani Soika, 1957
 Chlorodynerus mackenseni (Dusmet, 1917) 
 Chlorodynerus maidli (Giordani Soika, 1934)
 Chlorodynerus mochii Giordani Soika, 1957
 Chlorodynerus sanctus (Blüthgen, 1954) 
 Chlorodynerus schulthessianus (Kostylev, 1936) 
 Chlorodynerus somalus Giordani Soika, 1957
 Chlorodynerus xanthus (Cameron, 1907) 
 Chlorodynerus ypsilon (Kostylev, 1929)

References

Biological pest control wasps
Potter wasps